Dominik Hrníčko (born October 29, 1995) is a Czech professional ice hockey player. He is currently playing for HC Bílí Tygři Liberec of the Czech Extraliga.

Hrníčko made his Czech Extraliga debut playing with HC Bílí Tygři Liberec during the 2014-15 Czech Extraliga season.

References

External links

1995 births
Living people
HC Bílí Tygři Liberec players
Czech ice hockey forwards
Sportspeople from Liberec
HC Benátky nad Jizerou players
LHK Jestřábi Prostějov players
HC Dukla Jihlava players